The Pakistan national cricket team toured Ceylon from mid-March to mid-April 1949 and played four matches including two internationals against the Ceylon national team. As neither country had yet achieved Test status, the internationals are classified as first-class matches. Both games were played at the Paikiasothy Saravanamuttu Stadium in Colombo and Pakistan won them both: the first by an innings and 192 runs; the second by 10 wickets. These two matches were the first four-day internationals played in Ceylon. Pakistan were captained by Mohammed Saeed and Ceylon by Derrick de Saram.

The team

Mohammed Saeed (captain)
Abdur Rehman 
Alimuddin
Anwar Hussain
Aslam Khokhar
Usuf Chippa
Fazal Mahmood
Imtiaz Ahmed
Behram Irani 
Khan Mohammad
Maqsood Ahmed
Mohammad Amin
Murawwat Hussain
Nazar Mohammad
Shujauddin Butt

References

External links
Pakistan in Ceylon 1948-49 at CricketArchive
Team photograph from the Lord's Museum Collection

1949 in Pakistani cricket
1949 in Ceylon
1949
International cricket competitions from 1945–46 to 1960
Sri Lankan cricket seasons from 1880–81 to 1971–72